Spermaturia is condition characterized by the presence of sperm in the urine.

It can be observed in males of other species and then sometimes diagnosed in veterinary medicine. The cause is most often a retrograde ejaculation. It may be physiological during urination after coitus (postcoital urination).

See also
 Spermatorrhea
 Urination and sexual activity

References

Urinary bladder disorders
Infertility